Biotoecus is a fish genus of cichlids from northern South America where one species (B. dicentrarchus) is found in the Orinoco Basin and the other (B. opercularis) occurs in the northern part of the Amazon Basin. These small cichlids do not surpass  in length.

Species
The two recognized species in this genus are:
 Biotoecus dicentrarchus S. O. Kullander, 1989
 Biotoecus opercularis (Steindachner, 1875)

References
 

Geophagini
Cichlid genera
Taxa named by Carl H. Eigenmann